T. G. Vinayakumar (born 16 May 1957), professionally credited as Vinayan, is an Indian film director, screenwriter, producer, and lyricist, who works predominantly in Malayalam cinema and occasionally in Tamil cinema.

Early life
Vinayan is from Kuttanad, Kerala, India.

Career
Vinayan started his career with the film Super Star. And he has directed the following films like Vasanthiyum Lakshmiyum Pinne Njaanum, Akasha ganga 2,Karumadikkuttan, Oomappenninu Uriyadappayyan, Dada Sahib, Vellinakshatram, Aakasha Ganga, Rakshasa Rajavu, Kalyana Sougandhikam, Kasi (Tamil), Enn mana vaanil, Independence, Sathyam, Albhuthadweep, Athishayan, Dracula and Sipayi Lahala. The genres of his films include comedy, horror, action, fantasy and family drama.

Vinayan also introduced a handful of actors and singers in the Malayalam film industry. Jayasurya, Indrajith Sukumaran, Anoop Menon, Honey Rose, Priyamani, Manikkuttan, Suresh Krishna, Meghana Raj, Lakshmi Menon, Sithara(singer), Sudeep kumar(singer)etc. are some of the actors and singers Vinayan has introduced in Malayalam.

In 2005, Vinayan wrote and directed the film Albhuthadweep (Wonder Island) which cast around 300 dwarfs for the first time in a film. The two-foot-high hero of the film, Ajayan, was written in the Guinness Book of Records and Vinayan himself was listed in India's Limca Book of Records. The film garnered the FilmFare and the Cinema Express awards, and was successfully remade in 2007 in the Tamil language by Vinayan himself.

Vinayan has also remade a few of his films into Tamil. He is also a script writer and lyricist. He directed a Malayalam television serial Iniyonnu Visramikkatte before making movies.

Vinayan is the founder/president of the MACTA Federation. He has also launched a co-operative society (with the assistance of the Government of Kerala) for the benefit of film workers. Vinayan is also the Advisory Member of the Cine Workers Welfare Board, sponsored by the Government of India.

Personal life
Vinayan is married and has a son.

Filmography

Television serials
Iniyonnu Visramikkatte (Doordarshan)

As producer 
Aalilakkuruvikal
Aakasha Ganga
Raghuvinte Swantham Rasiya
Dracula
Little Superman

As lyricist 
Karumadikuttan
Rakshasarajavu
Omappenninu Uriyadapayyan
Kaattuchembakam 
Meerayude dhukavum muthuvinte swapnavum 
Sathyam
Albhuthadweep
Boyy Friennd
Athisayan 
Yakshiyum Njanum 
Raguvinte Swantham Rasia
Dracula 2012 3D

As actor
Aalilakkuruvikal as Postman
Kallu Kondoru Pennu as Jouranilst
avano atho avalo -raju [1979]

Meenamasathile sooryan

As writer
Superstar
Aayiram Chirakulla Moham (story)
Kanyakumariyil oru kavitha (story)
Sipayi Lahala (story)
Independence(story)
Vasanthiyum Lakshmiyum Pinne Njaanum (story)
Daadasaahib (story)
Karumaadikuttan(story)
Rakshasa Rajavu (full script)
Kaasi (full script)
Oomapenninu uruyadapayyan (story)
kaattuchembakam (full script)
En Mana Vaanil (full script)
War&Love (story &co-script)
Meerayude dhukavum muthuvinte swapnavum (full script)
Vellinakshathram (full script)
Sathyam (full script)
Albhuthadweep (full script)
Boyfriend (story)
Hareendran oru Nishkalankan (screenplay only)
Athishayan (full script)
Black Cat (full script)
Yakshiyum Njanum (full script)
Raghvinte Swantham Rasia (full script)
Dracula (full script)
Little superman (full script)
Chaalkudikaaran changathi (story co-screenplay)

Awards

Film critics award for best director – Vasanthiyum Lakshmiyum Pinne Njaanum
Atlas award best director – Dada sahib
Cine Express Awards
Best Film Director – Karumadikkuttan
J C Foundation Awards
Best Film Director – Chaalakkudikkaaran Changathi

Filmfare Awards South
 2001: Filmfare Award for Best Director – Malayalam Karumadikuttan

References

External links

20th-century Indian film directors
Tamil film directors
Malayalam film directors
Living people
Filmfare Awards South winners
21st-century Indian film directors
Film directors from Kerala
People from Alappuzha district
1960 births